The Electoral district of Castlemaine and Kyneton was an electoral district of the Victorian Legislative Assembly (Australia).

History
Castlemaine Boroughs was created in 1856 and abolished in 1859. It was replaced by Castlemaine in 1859 which was itself abolished in 1904. Then Castlemaine and Maldon was created in 1904 and abolished in 1927, Harry Lawson was the member for its entire existence and was the first member for Castlemaine and Kyneton.

Members for Castlemaine and Kyneton

Election results

See also
 Parliaments of the Australian states and territories
 List of members of the Victorian Legislative Assembly

References

Former electoral districts of Victoria (Australia)
1927 establishments in Australia
1945 disestablishments in Australia